Daryl Peach (born 8 March 1972) is an English professional pool player, from Lancashire, who resides in Blackpool, England. He won the 2007 WPA World Nine-ball Championship, where he defeated the Philippines' Roberto Gomez 17–15 in the final to become the first British player to win the WPA World Nine-ball Championship.

Representing England with partner Mark Gray, Peach has competed at the World Cup of Pool on six occasions, reaching the final in 2008 and 2015. Peach represented Great Britain and won the inaugural World Team Championship in 2010. He has also represented Europe in the Mosconi Cup in 1995 and 2007, and was a member of the winning team on both occasions. Peach was the youngest winner of the World Pool Masters, his first pool tournament, winning the 1995 event at the age of 23 years and three months. He is also the first player to have been ranked number one in the UK rankings, European tour rankings, and WPA World rankings concurrently.

Peach is a five-time winner on the Euro Tour, having won events from 2007 until 2012. With a total of nine medals from tour events, Peach is the tenth most successful player on the tour of all time.

Career

Snooker and transition to pool (1991–1995)
Daryl Peach was born on 8 March 1972 in Castleford, Yorkshire, England. Peach moved to Blackpool when he was fourteen. Originally a snooker player, Peach turned professional in 1991 but was unable to reach the TV stages of any tournaments. Peach played alongside the likes of Ronnie O'sullivan, Mark Williams, John Higgins, who all were battling in the qualifying rounds at the same time.  He reached a peak ranking of 250th in the world on the World Snooker Tour. His last snooker tournament was the 1995 Welsh Open, where he lost 4–5 to Matthew Stevens in the opening qualifying round.

Following this loss, Peach was convinced by a friend to take up nine-ball pool, and entered a UK ranking event "just to see". Peach won this even in convincing fashion, beating some of the highest ranked UK players along the way. After his initial win, Peach entered the next 3 UK ranking events, winning then all to make it 4 out of 4. He quickly rose to the top of the UK rankings, and because of this, he received an invite into the 1995 European Pool Masters tournament (which later became the World Pool Masters). Peach sailed through the event, defeating Lee Kendall in the final, making him the youngest winner of the tournament at age 23 years and three months. Following his win, he was invited to represent Europe at the 1995 Mosconi Cup partnering pool players Kendall, Oliver Ortmann, Tom Storm, and snooker players Steve Davis, Alex Higgins, and Jimmy White. The European team won the series, 16–15; with Peach playing an integral part in the Europeans first ever victory in the event. Following his huge successes, Peach decided not to renew his professional snooker status, opting to play pool instead.

Post European Masters (1996–2004)
After his binding start to his Pool career, Peach spent to next few years cementing his place at the top of the UK rankings, playing in between 25 and 30 UK ranking events per year. He slowly started to filter more and more European events into his calendar, along with the odd world major event. Peach competed in the World Pool Masters, reaching the semi finals twice. He reached the quarter finals of the 2004 WPA World Eight-ball Championship, where he lost to Michael Schmidt 10–7. Peach was also starting to knock on the door on the tough Euro Tour, reaching the semi-finals of the Austria Open. Later he reached the final of the German Open, runner-up to Oliver Ortmann.

United Kingdom number one again...
In 2005, Peach competed in all six Euro Tour events, reaching the main stages in each of them. He reached the round-of-16 stage at the Belgium and Swiss Opens, the quarter-finals at the German and Costa Del Sol Opens, and the semi-finals of the Austria Open. He later reached the quarter-finals of the WPA World Eight-ball Championship, after defeating Souquet in the round of 16, losing to eventual champion Wu Jia-qing. His season results led him to become the number one ranked player in the United Kingdom, a position that was becoming to be a given for Peach.

This success gave him the opportunity to represent England at the 2006 World Cup of Pool doubles event, where he partnered Steve Davis. In the first round, the pair defeated the South Korean team of Jeong Young-hwa and Lee Gun-jae 9–6, but lost in the quarter-finals to Earl Strickland and Rodney Morris of the United States. in late 2006, Peach decided to enter a qualifying event in Holland to win a place on the new International Pool Tour (IPT), which he won. He played in both the IPT World Open (eight-ball) and the IPT North American Open, finishing in 17th and 7th places, respectively.

World nine-ball champion (2007)
In 2007, Peach won his first Euro Tour event, the German Open.On route to the final, he beat Alex Lely 10-6, Dzmitry Chuprov 10–3, Niels Feijen 10–7, Thorsten Hohmann 10–7, and David Alcaide 10–5. In the final, he defeated Dimitri Jungo 10–3.

In November, Peach entered the 2007 WPA World Nine-ball Championship, held at the infamous Araneta Coluseum in Manila, Philippines, the same exact arena where Muhammad Ali defeated Joe Frazier in the famous "Thriller in Manila" fight, seeded 17th for the event. He won his double elimination rounds, reaching the knockout rounds. He then defeated defending champion Ronato Alcano 10–6, former runner up Lee Kung-fang 10–7, and Harald Stolka 11–5, to reach the quarter-finals. There, Peach played another former runner up Francisco Bustamante. Bustamante lead 10–9 in a -to-11-racks match. Despite Bustamante celebrating the victory, referee Nigel Reese consulted a television replay of the shot, and declared it was a foul, awarding Peach . The actual foul shot was replayed on the big overhead screens, showing that there was no doubt that the shot was a foul. Following the decision, it took over 10 minutes for the heavily partizan crowd to calm down and accept the decision. With ball in hand, Peach ran out the high pressured rack to tie the match at 10-10. He then kept Bustamente in his chair completing his victory with a solid break and run in the final rack decider, winning 11–10.

The semi-final featured Peach defeating Hungarian player Vilmos Foldes 11–2 to set up a final match vs Roberto Gomez. In the race-to-17-racks match, Peach took to the table better, reaching an early five-rack lead at 8–3. Gomez won six racks in a row to take the lead before Peach went ahead by two at 12–10. Gomez dug in again to regain the lead and go 15–12 ahead. Then it was Peach's turn to build the come back, levelling the match at 15-15. A long safety battle ensued in rack 32, which was dominated by Peach, allowing him to get the first chance. He convincingly ran  the rack to win the championship, and become the first ever British winner of the event.

In becoming world champion, Peach was then selected to represent Europe once again, at the 2007 Mosconi Cup. He partnered Souquet, Feijen, Konstantin Stepanov, and Tony Drago.Here, Peach won his 2nd Mosconi Cup winners medal, making it 2 from 2 attempts. probably more famously than the win itself, In his interview after his match against Earl Strickland, Peach branded his opponent the "scum of the earth", following claims that Strickland purposefully attempted to distract Peach. The pair were later separated by Michaela Tabb, even after a warning from Tabb against Strickland.

Reigning world champion (2008–2010)
Following Peach's world championship victory, he reached the round-of-16 stage of both the 2008 WPA World Eight-ball Championship and the U.S. Open Nine-ball Championship. In October 2008, Peach partnered Mark Gray at the 2008 World Cup of Pool. They reached the event's final, losing to the American team of Rodney Morris and Shane Van Boening. The World Nine-ball Championship was cancelled, so Peach retained his world championship status until the event returned in 2010.

Peach was chosen to represent Great Britain at the 2010 World Team Championship alongside Darren Appleton, Imran Majid, Karl Boyes, and Mark Gray. The team qualified for the round of 16, where they defeated Germany 4–0. In their quarter-final against the People's Republic of China, the match finished tied at 3–3, and so a tiebreaker was played in a race-to-six-racks. However, the winning team had to win by two clear racks. The match lasted significantly over six racks, with Peach making the winning shot to win 27–25. The team defeated Greece 4–2 to reach the final. In the final, the team played the Filipino team, winning 4–1 to become world champions.

Post world championship (2011–present)
In 2011, Peach won both the international 9bal and international 8ball, a feat which has never been repeated. He reached the quarter final of both the World nine-ball and ten-ball championships.

At the 2015 World Cup of Pool, Peach and partner Mark Gray reached the final once again, but lost 8–10 to the Chinese Taipei team of Ko Pin-yi and Chang Yu-lung. S

After this point, Peach lost both his parents, and also had a major injury to his right shoulder, which meant that he played sporadically in tournaments Since.

Personal life
Peach is married to Lesley Peach; they have one child named Ellie. Peach is an amateur golfer, having gained a handicap of eight in 2010. When not playing pool, he develops real estate.

Titles
 2013 Interpool Open 10-Ball Challenge 
 2012 Longoni Benelux Open 
 2012 Euro Tour German Open
 2010 WPA World Team Championship
 2010 Euro Tour Italy Open
 2010 GB Blackpool Pro Cup
 2009 Lugo International Nine-Ball Open
 2009 Euro Tour Portugal Open
 2007 WPA World Nine-ball Championship
 2007 Mosconi Cup
 2007 Euro Tour German Open
 1995 Mosconi Cup
 1995 World Pool Masters

See also

References

External links
 

1972 births
Living people
English pool players
Sportspeople from Castleford
World champions in pool
WPA World Nine-ball Champions